Mitiku Haile (born 1951) is Professor of Soil Science at Mekelle University (Ethiopia), undertaking research on sustainable land management, restoration of degraded lands and integrated soil fertility management.

Career
 1985: MSc at Ghent University, Belgium
 1987: PhD at Ghent University, Belgium, under the supervision of Prof. Dr. ir. C. Sys
 1987: Assistant professor of Soil Science at Alamaya, now Haramaya University
 1990: staff member of the Arid Zone Agricultural College (established at the University of Asmara, and later on Agarfa in southern Ethiopia)
 1993: dean of the Arid Zone Agricultural College in Mekelle that started with 42 students in 3 degree programmes. Later on, with the establishment of Mekelle University College, he became its dean also.

 2000: president of Mekelle University that was established by the Government of Ethiopia (Council of Ministers, Regulations No. 61/1999 of Article 3) as an autonomous higher education institution
 2011: Minister Plenipotentiary and Deputy Permanent Representative to UNESCO, Ethiopian Embassy in Paris
 2015: Reinstated as Full Professor at the Department of Land Resources Management and Environmental Protection of Mekelle University

Trivia 
The Mitiku Hall at Mekelle University is named after him.

External links 
 Mitiku Haile, Karl Herweg, Brigitta Stillhardt (2006): Sustainable Land Management – A New Approach to Soil and Water Conservation in Ethiopia
 Publication list on ResearchGate
 History of Professor Mitiku's academic cooperation with Belgium

References

Ghent University alumni
Ethiopian scientists
Living people
1951 births
Soil scientists
20th-century scientists
21st-century scientists